The Women's British Open is an annual golf competition held at the end of July start of August, and is conducted by the R&A. Established in 1976, it has been recognised as a major championship by the Ladies European Tour (LET) since 1992, became a recognised LPGA event in 1994, and became one of the LPGA's major championships in 2001.  it is the fifth and last of the LPGA's five majors, preceded by the ANA Inspiration (formerly Kraft Nabisco Championship), U.S. Women's Open, the Women's PGA Championship and the Evian Championship (formerly Evian Masters). This event has always been conducted in stroke play competition.

Yani Tseng's victories in 2010 and 2011 and Jiyai Shin's in 2008 and 2012 make them the only two golfers to win the event twice since it became an LPGA major. The only other golfers to successfully defend their titles are Debbie Massey in 1980 and 1981, before the tournament became a part of the LPGA tour, and Sherri Steinhauer in 1998 and 1999, when it was a sanctioned LPGA event but not yet a major.

The lowest winning score in the tournament's history as an LPGA major is Karen Stupples's 19-under par 269 aggregate in 2004, equalling the record score set by Karrie Webb in 1997. The Women's British Open has had two wire-to-wire champions as a major: Jang Jeong in 2005 and Lorena Ochoa in 2007.

Key

Champions

Multiple champions
This table lists the golfers who have won more than one Women's British Open as a major. Champions who won in consecutive years are indicated by the years with italics*.
Key

Champions by nationality
This table lists the total number of titles won by golfers of each nationality as an LPGA major (2001–present).

Notes
 This tournament has had several names, which are the following; 2001–2006: Weetabix Women's British Open, 2007–2018: Ricoh Women's British Open, 2019: AIG Women's British Open, 2020–present AIG Women's Open.

See also
Chronological list of LPGA major golf champions
List of LPGA major championship winning golfers
Grand Slam (golf)

References
General

Specific

External links
LPGA Tour's tournament profile

champions
Brit
Women's British Open champions